Mamelles is an island in Seychelles, lying  northeast of Mahe.

Geography
The fauna of the island is represented only by wild rabbits and sea birds, including terns, which nest on the island.

The name of the island comes from the French word «mamelles», which means "breast". This strange island was called because of its shape - two high hills in the south and the north, and a relatively deep hollow between them. On the southern hill, which is slightly higher than the north, There is a lighthouse which was constructed in 15 December 1911.
On the shores of the island, the wreck of the tanker Ennerdale from 1970, which is a favorite dive site.

Gallery

References 

Islands of Mahé Islands
Uninhabited islands of Seychelles